Stephanie Tibbits (born 26 February 1975) is a Canadian former professional tennis player.

Tibbits represented Canada at the 1991 Pan American Games in Havana. Tibbits was a two-time Canadian U18 National Champion in 1992 and 1993.  On the professional tour, she reached a career high singles ranking of 368 in the world and made WTA Tour main draw appearance as a qualifier at the 1993 Challenge Bell in Quebec City, where she fell in the first round to the top seed Helena Suková. From 1996 to 1999 she played collegiate tennis for the California Golden Bears of UC Berkeley.

ITF finals

Doubles: 1 (1–0)

References

External links
 
 

1975 births
Living people
Canadian female tennis players
Tennis players at the 1991 Pan American Games
Pan American Games competitors for Canada
California Golden Bears women's tennis players